Hechuan is a town under the administration of Yongxin County, Jiangxi, China. , it has ten residential neighborhoods and 21 villages under its administration:
Neighborhoods
Fanrong Community
Xianggan Community
Xuebei Community
Beimen Community
Ximen Community
Xiushui Community
Chengbei Community
Hedong Community
Erji
Ganhua

Villages
Xiguang Village
Beimen Village
Xuebei Village
Ximen Village
Xiushui Village
Xisheng Village
Paotian Village
Faguan Village
Quanshan Village
Sanyueping Village
Dongli Village
Hengjiang Village
Biantian Village
Yangjia Village
Nanche Village
Futou Village
Zhangshi Village
Miaoshan Village
Lutang Village
Xiaduan Village
Jingquan Village

References 

Township-level divisions of Jiangxi
Yongxin County